Francis III (28 February 1518 – 10 August 1536) was Duke of Brittany and Dauphin of Viennois. He was the first son of King Francis I of France and Duchess Claude of Brittany.

Life 
Francis I said of his son at birth, "a beautiful dauphin who is the most beautiful and strong child one could imagine and who will be the easiest to bring up."  His mother, Claude, Duchess of Brittany, said, "tell the King that he is even more beautiful than himself."  The Dauphin was christened at Amboise on 25 April 1519. Leonardo da Vinci, who had been brought to Amboise by Francis I, designed the decorations.

One of the most researched aspects of the Dauphin's short life is the time he and his brother Henry (later Henry II of France) spent as hostages in Spain. The king had been badly defeated and captured at the Battle of Pavia (1525) and became a prisoner of Charles V, the Holy Roman Emperor, initially in the Alcázar in Madrid. In order to ensure his release, the king signed the Treaty of Madrid (1526). However, in order to ensure that Francis abided by the treaty, Charles demanded that the king's two older sons take his place as hostages. Francis agreed.

On 15 March 1526, the exchange took place at the border between Spain and France. Francis almost immediately repudiated the treaty and the eight-year-old Dauphin and his younger brother Henry spent the next three years as captives of Charles V, a period that scarred them for life. The Dauphin's "somber, solitary tastes" and his preference for dressing in black (like a Spaniard) were attributed to the time he spent in captivity in Madrid. He also became bookish, preferring reading to soldiering.

Marriage arrangements 
As first son and heir to a king of France the Dauphin was a marriage pawn for his father.  He could not be wasted in marriage, as many felt his brother Henry had been with his marriage to Catherine de' Medici, and there were several betrothals to eligible princesses throughout the Dauphin's life. The first was when he was an infant, to the four-year-old Mary Tudor (later Mary I of England), daughter of Henry VIII of England and Catherine of Aragon; this arrangement was made as a surety for the Anglo-French alliance signed in October 1518, but abandoned around 1521 when Mary was instead betrothed to Charles V.

Duchy of Brittany 
In 1524, the Dauphin inherited the Duchy of Brittany on his mother's death, becoming Duke Francis III, although the Duchy was actually ruled by officials of the French crown. The Duchy was inherited upon the death of Francis by his brother, Henry; upon Henry's succession to the French throne in 1547, the Duchy and the crown were effectively merged, the Breton estates having already tied the succession of the Duchy to the French crown, rather than to the line of succession of the Dukes of Brittany, by vote in 1532.

Death 
The Dauphin Francis died at Château Tournon-sur-Rhône on 10 August 1536, at the age of eighteen.  The circumstances of his death seemed suspicious, and it is believed by many that he was poisoned.  However, there is ample evidence that he died of natural causes, possibly tuberculosis.  The Dauphin had never fully recovered his health from the years spent in damp, dank cells in Madrid.

After playing a round of tennis at a jeu de paume court "pré[s] d'Ainay", the Dauphin asked for a cup of water, which was brought to him by his secretary, Count Montecuccoli.  After drinking it, Francis collapsed and died several days later. Montecuccoli, who was brought to the court by Catherine de' Medici, was accused of being in the pay of Charles V, and when his quarters were searched a book on different types of poison was found.  Catherine de' Medici was well known to have an interest in poisons and the occult.  Under torture, Montecuccoli confessed to poisoning the Dauphin.

In an age before forensic science, poison was usually suspected whenever a young, healthy person died shortly after eating or drinking.  There was no way to pinpoint and trace the substance after death; therefore, it was considered a quick, easy and untraceable form of homicide.  There have been several other suspected cases of political-murder-by-poison in the French royal family through the ages.

Ancestry

References 

1518 births
1536 deaths
16th-century dukes of Brittany
Burials at the Basilica of Saint-Denis
People from Amboise
House of Valois-Angoulême
Dauphins of Viennois
Dauphins of France
Dukes of Brittany
Heirs apparent who never acceded
French people of Italian descent
French people of Breton descent
16th-century peers of France
Sons of kings